Two male athletes from Colombia competed at the 1996 Summer Paralympics in Atlanta, United States.

See also
Colombia at the Paralympics
Colombia at the 1996 Summer Olympics

References 

Nations at the 1996 Summer Paralympics
1996
Summer Paralympics